Raihan Rafi (born 3 March 1989) is a Bangladeshi film director and screenwriter. He is best known for his 2018 directorial debut PoraMon 2, produced by Abdul Aziz and under the banner of Jaaz Multimedia. The film won three Meril Prothom Alo Awards for Most Critic Movie of the Year, Best Actor and Best Actress.

Filmography 
He has directed two films in his career beginning with Poramon2 (2018). In 2018 he directed another movie, Dahan. In 2021, his first web film has released named Janowar. He is directing three new movies: Swapnobaji, Damal and Noor to be released in 2022.

Films 
 PoraMon 2 (2018)
 Dahan (2018)
 Poran (2022)
 Damal (2022)
 Noor (Upcoming)
 Premik (Upcoming)
 Surongo (Upcoming)
 Friday (2023)

Web content 
 Janowar (2020)
 The Dark Side Of Dhaka (2021)
 Khachar Bhitor Ochin Pakhi (2021)
 Taan (2022)
 Floor Number 7 (2022)
 Nishwas (2022)

Short films
Janer Desh Bangladesh (Harleo Bangladesh Jitleo Bangladesh)
Ajob Baksho
A Story Of Ratan
Digital Movie and Theater (Produced by Jaaz Multimedia)
Zahir 
Agaami
3 Minute 5 Taka (2019)
Nirbak (2019)
Arranged Marriage 2 (2019)
Projapotir Bhalobasha (2019)
Sacrifice (2019)
Chithi (2019)
Connection (2020)
Oxygen (2020)
Eida Kopal (2021)

References

External links

 
 

Living people
People from Sylhet District
Bengali film directors
Bangladeshi film directors
1989 births
Bangladeshi screenwriters
Male screenwriters
Bangladeshi male writers
21st-century Bangladeshi writers
21st-century male writers
21st-century screenwriters